Monika Bayer (born 12 June 1967) is an Austrian swimmer. She competed in the women's 400 metre individual medley at the 1984 Summer Olympics.

References

External links
 

1967 births
Living people
Austrian female medley swimmers
Olympic swimmers of Austria
Swimmers at the 1984 Summer Olympics
Place of birth missing (living people)